Krinides (before 1926: Ράχτσα - Rachtsa) is a town in the Kavala regional unit in eastern Macedonia, Greece. It was the seat of the former municipality of Filippoi. The ruins of the ancient city Philippi are close to the town. Krinides is situated at the southwestern foot of the Lekanis hills, 13 km northwest of Kavala and 20 km southeast of Drama. The Greek National Road 12 between Drama and Kavala passes west of Krinides.

History
Krinides was named after the ancient town Crenides. Formerly a possession of the island of Thasos, Crenides was captured by King Philip II of Macedon in 356 BC, who expanded and fortified the city and renamed it Philippi after himself.

Historical population

References

Populated places in Kavala (regional unit)